Tussles in Brussels is a live DVD released by Swedish punk rock band The Hives. The live performance was recorded on 29 October 2004 at Ancienne Belgique while the band was on tour in Brussels, Belgium. The DVD also includes extras such as four music videos from the band, five television performances (including performances on Top of the Pops), and a 30-minute documentary film narrated by Little Steven as D. W. Johnson.

Performance track listing
 "Abra Cadaver" – 1:39
 "Antidote" – 3:01
 "Missing Link" – 2:11
 "Main Offender" – 2:36
 "State Control" – 3:37
 "Walk Idiot Walk" – 4:05
 "Outsmarted" – 3:01
 "A Little More For Little You" – 4:16
 "Die, All Right!" – 2:41
 "The Hives - Declare Guerre Nucleaire" – 2:17
 "No Pun Intended" – 3:29
 "Hate To Say I Told You So" – 5:31
 "Born to Cry" – 2:22
 "Supply and Demand" – 4:53
 "Diabolic Scheme" – 3:15
 "Two-Timing Touch and Broken Bones" – 4:55
 "B is for Brutus" – 2:38
 "Dead Quote Olympics" – 2:27
 "A.K.A. I-D-I-O-T" – 4:15

Television spots

Top of the Pops
"Main Offender"
"Walk Idiot Walk"

Later with Jools Holland
"Main Offender"
"Supply and Demand"
"Die, All Right!"
"Hate to Say I Told You So"

Videos
"A Little More For Little You"
"Abra Cadaver"
"Walk Idiot Walk"
"Two-Timing Touch and Broken Bones"
"Main Offender"
"Hate to Say I Told You So"
"A.K.A I-D-I-O-T"
"Die, All Right!"

The Hives albums